The CBS sitcom television series Everybody Loves Raymond aired 210 episodes throughout its run from September 13, 1996, to May 16, 2005. The series follows the life of Ray Romano as the titular Newsday sportswriter Ray Barone and how he handles conflicts with his neurotic family, including wife Debra (Patricia Heaton), mother Marie (Doris Roberts), father Frank (Peter Boyle), brother Robert (Brad Garrett), daughter Ally (Madylin Sweeten), and twin boys Michael and Geoffrey (Sullivan and Sawyer Sweeten). 

Although originally suffering low ratings due to being in the Friday night death slot, Everybody Loves Raymond, after its move to Monday night in March 1997, rose up to tying with Friends and Monday Night Football in the 2000–01 television season. The show was also critically acclaimed and won 15 Primetime Emmy Awards, including Outstanding Comedy Series in 2003 and 2005. The series has been ranked the 60th best of all time by TV Guide and the eleventh-best sitcom starring a stand-up comedian by Rolling Stone, with the episode "Marie's Sculpture" on TV Guide's 2009 all-time list of 100 Greatest Episodes at number 42. Each season has been released on DVD, with a few compilation DVDs and complete series sets also issued.

Series overview

Episodes

Season 1 (1996–97)

Season 2 (1997–98)

Season 3 (1998–99)

Season 4 (1999–2000)

Season 5 (2000–01)

Season 6 (2001–02)

Season 7 (2002–03)

Season 8 (2003–04)

Season 9 (2004–05)

Ratings

References

External links
 

Lists of American sitcom episodes